Kristinsson is a surname. Notable people with the surname include:

Birkir Kristinsson (born 1964), Icelandic football goalkeeper
Brynjar Kristinsson (born 1988), Icelandic cross-country skier
Jón Kristinsson (born 1942), Icelandic chess player
Rúnar Kristinsson (born 1969), Icelandic footballer